The National Film Award for Best Production Design is one of the National Film Awards presented annually by the Directorate of Film Festivals, the organisation set up by Ministry of Information and Broadcasting, India. It is one of several awards presented for feature films and awarded with Rajat Kamal (Silver Lotus).

The award was instituted in 1979, at 27th National Film Awards as National Film Award for Best Art Direction, and awarded annually for films produced in the year across the country, in all Indian languages; Hindi (18 awards), Tamil (6 awards), Malayalam (6 awards), Bengali (3 awards), Kannada, Urdu, English, Marathi (two each), Telugu, Gujarati, Punjabi, Konkani (one Each).

The award renamed as National Film Award for Best Production Design from the 57th National Film Awards in 2011.

Multiple winners 
 4 Wins: Nitin Chandrakant Desai , Samir Chanda & Sabu Cyril
 3 Wins: Nitish Roy & P. Krishnamoorthy
 2 Wins: Jayoo Patwardhan, Thota Tharani & Indranil Ghosh

Recipients 

Award includes 'Rajat Kamal' (Silver Lotus) and cash prize. Following are the award winners over the years:

References

External links 
 Official Page for Directorate of Film Festivals, India
 National Film Awards Archives
 National Film Awards at IMDb

Production Design
Awards for best art direction
Ministry of Information and Broadcasting (India)